Edward Bowen may refer to:

 Edward Bowen (politician) (1780–1866), Irish-born lawyer and politician in Lower Canada
 Edward Ernest Bowen (1836–1901), Harrow schoolmaster and sportsman
 Edward Bowen (footballer, born 1858) (1858–1923), Druids F.C. and Wales international footballer
 Edward George Bowen (1911–1991), British physicist
 Edward L. Bowen (born c. 1942), American author of books on Thoroughbred horse racing
 Edward Bowen (priest) (1828–1897), Anglican priest in Ireland
Sir Edward Bowen, 2nd Baronet  (1885–1937) of the Bowen baronets

See also
Bowen (surname)